Ab-e Gandu (also Romanized as Āb-e Gandū; also known as Āb Gandeh, Āb-i-Gandeh, Āb Kandeh, Āb Kandū, and Āb Qandū) is a village in Nujin Rural District, in the Central District of Farashband County, Fars Province, Iran. At the 2006 census, its population was 101, in 26 families.

References 

Populated places in Farashband County